The Ling-Temco-Vought XQM-93 was a remotely piloted aircraft developed in the United States in the late 1960s and early 1970s for use as a communications relay in the Vietnam War. A prototype flew in 1970, but the program was abandoned without producing a service-ready aircraft.

Design and development
In the late 1960s, following the early microwave HALE (High Altitude Long Endurance) vehicle studies, the US Air Force worked with LTV Electrosystems (later E-Systems) under the Compass Dwell program to build an unmanned aerial vehicle (UAV) using much more conventional turboprop propulsion. At least part of the motivation or inspiration for this effort was derived from the Igloo White program, which was a multiservice attempt to cut the flow of supplies from North Vietnam to South Vietnam through the network of paths and roads running through Cambodia and Laos known as the "Ho Chi Minh Trail".

Igloo White involved seeding the region with thousands of seismic and acoustic sensors, most of them air-dropped, which would pick up indications of traffic along the trail and report them back to a central command center in Thailand, which would dispatch air strikes in response. The sensors were battery-operated and had limited range, so airborne radio relay aircraft orbited above the battle area to pick up the signals and pass them on to the command center.

Originally, the radio relays were Lockheed EC-121 Warning Star aircraft, a military variant of the Lockheed L-1049 Super Constellation four piston engined aircraft, but these machines were expensive to operate. They were replaced by Beech Debonaire single-engine light aircraft, modified for the radio relay role and given the military designation of QU-22A. They could be operated as drones, but apparently nobody trusted that as operational practice, and they were never flown unpiloted except as experiments.

LTV Electrosystems' development effort focused on an endurance aircraft that could be flown as a piloted aircraft or a UAV. A number of prototypes, including piloted and UAV versions, were built and flown. They were based on a Schweizer SGS 2-32 sailplane design with major modifications by Schweizer to accommodate a Pratt & Whitney Canada PT6A-34 turboprop engine, large fuel tanks, and operational payloads. The aircraft had fixed tricycle landing gear.

The first prototype, designated the L-450F, was piloted. It first flew in February 1970, but was lost in an accident on its third flight in March 1970, the pilot bailing out safely. A second L-450F was built and used to complete the flight test program. The third prototype, the first UAV variant, was designated the XQM-93 and flew in early 1972. It had no cockpit or other provisions for piloted flight. It could carry a payload of 320 kilograms (700 pounds). The Air Force ordered four XQM-93s but it is unclear if they were actually delivered, since Compass Dwell was cancelled that year.

Surviving Airframes

N2450F cn 002 is now on display in the Vintage Flying Museum at Fort Worth Meacham International Airport.

72-1287 is now on display in the Frontiers of Flight Museum at Dallas Love Field Airport.

Specifications (prototype)

See also

References

Notes

This article contains material that originally came from the web article Unmanned Aerial Vehicles by Greg Goebel, which exists in the Public Domain.

Bibliography

External links

 E-Systems GQM-93 at Designation-Systems.Net

QM-093
1970s United States special-purpose aircraft
Unmanned aerial vehicles of the United States
Single-engined tractor aircraft
Mid-wing aircraft
Single-engined turboprop aircraft
Cancelled military aircraft projects of the United States
Aircraft first flown in 1970